"Gole Sangam" sometimes "Gol-e Sangam" or just "Gole Sang" is an iconic Persian language song from the 1970s, composed by the Iranian composer and pianist Anoushiravan Rohani and lyrics written by Iranian poet and lyricist Bijan Samandar . A hugely popular tune in Iran, Afghanistan and Tajikistan it has gained international fame. "Gole Sangam" meaning "my stone flower", talks about someone in love, yet facing rejection from the person he/she loves. 

The lyrics say:

گل سـنگم گل سنگم (transliteration Gole sangam, gole sangam) (meaning I am a stone flower, I am a stone flower)
چی بـگم از دل تـنـگم (transliteration Chi begam az dele tangam) (meaning What to say for my longing heart)
مثل آفتاب اگـه بـر من (transliteration Mesle aftab age bar man) (meaning Like the sun, if you don't shine on me)
نتابی سردم و بیرنگم (transliteration Natabi sardam o bi rangam) (meaning I will be cold and colorless)

The song has been subject of tens of interpretations and recordings and sung in many languages. The most famous versions include those by Persian singers Hassan Sattar and Hayedeh and by Afghan singer Ahmad Zahir.

References

 Persian-language songs